Sealift Incorporated is an American shipping company based in Oyster Bay, New York.  The privately held corporation was founded in 1975 by the four owners who remain the principal executives.  Sealift Inc. is one of the largest ocean contractors for transporting U.S. food aid and participates in the Voluntary Intermodal Sealift Agreement.  Between the start of fiscal 2000 and the first quarter of 2008, Sealift Inc. was awarded US$402,151,046 in contracts.

Sealift's main fleet consists of eleven ships: container ships, general cargo ships, and a combination general/container ship.  The fleet has ships from 12 to 39 years of age, includes two steamships, and three small ships under . Separate from the main fleet, the company also owns the ex-US Navy MSC HSV-2 Swift. In 2015 Swift was sold to the United Arab Emirates' National Marine Dredging Company. On 1 October 2016, she was reported to have been severely damaged by an anti-ship missile in the Bab-el-Mandeb strait, off the coast of Yemen.

Sealift Inc has collective bargaining agreements with the Seafarer's International Union and the American Maritime Officers union.

History
Originally a shipbrokerage house specializing in paper, rice, and general cargo, Sealift Inc operated breakbulk liner services to the Mediterranean and from Brazil.  The company currently operates a fleet of twelve U.S.-Flag, ocean-going and is one of the largest ocean transportation contractors for U.S. Government Food Aid cargoes.

Sealift Inc. is one of the largest ocean contractors for transporting U.S. food aid and participates in the Voluntary Intermodal Sealift Agreement.  This program, also known as VISA, supplies the Pentagon with private cargo vessels which it can use to support "contingency deployments." The program saves the government the cost of maintaining a large fleet that would be idle in peacetime.  In 2003, the company was awarded an emergency three-month, $4 million contract from USAID to provide freight service to Iraq.

Between the beginning of fiscal year 2000 and the first quarter of fiscal 2008, Sealift Inc. was awarded US$ 402.15 million in 207 separate transactions.  $355.69 million was allocated from the Department of the Navy, $24.61 million from the U.S. Agency for International Development, and $21.85 million from the Department of the Army.

Fleet

Sealift's primary fleet consists of eleven ships, each of which is a container ship, a general cargo ship, or a combination general/container ship. ranging from 12 to 39 years of age. The average age for all of Sealift's ships is slightly over 27 years.

The company previously owned and operated the oil tanker MT Montauk which carried jet fuel and other petroleum products between South Korea and Japan under a charter from Military Sealift Command. but sold the ship to the Cypriot company Kalia Maritime Co. Ltd. on February 1, 2007.

As of 2015, HSV-2 Swift was reported to have been sold to the United Arab Emirates' National Marine Dredging Company. On 1 October 2016, the ship was attacked and seriously damaged off Yemen. Houthi rebels claimed the ship sank. According to unnamed US Department of Defense officials, the damaged ship was being towed to Eritrea. The vessel sustained serious damage to its bow, but remained afloat.

Notes

References

External links
Company Profile at Det Norske Veritas
Current MV Virginian contract
HSV Swift contract
Containership contract 
MV Bennett charter renewal 
MV Bennett at fas.org 
MV Merlin renamed to MV Chapman
MV Fisher at MSC
MV Bennett at MSC 

Shipping companies of the United States
Container shipping companies of the United States
Companies based in Nassau County, New York
American companies established in 1975
1975 establishments in New York (state)
Private military contractors
Container shipping companies